Introducing Kenny Cox is the debut album by American jazz pianist Kenny Cox featuring performances recorded in 1968 and released on the Blue Note label. The 2000 CD reissue added Cox's second Blue Note album Multidirection as bonus tracks.

Reception
The Allmusic review by Matt Collar awarded the album 4 stars stating "Though well-versed in the traditions of jazz standards and bop, Cox and his ensemble resemble most closely here the classic Miles Davis quintet of the mid- and late '60s. But rather than merely aping Davis, the Contemporary Jazz Quintet had a muscular and urban group sensibility all its own. In that sense, this is fiery, expansive and cerebral post-bop of the highest order".

Track listing
All compositions by Kenny Cox except as indicated
 "Mystique" - 4:44 
 "You" (David Durrah) - 5:28 
 "Trance Dance" - 6:08 
 "Eclipse" (Leon Henderson) - 5:51 
 "Number Four" (Charles Moore) - 10:48 
 "Diahnn" (Henderson) - 8:37 
 "Spellbound" - 5:23  Bonus track on CD reissue  
 "Snuck In" (Moore) - 6:03  Bonus track on CD reissue  
 "Sojourn" - 6:36  Bonus track on CD reissue  
 "Multidirection" (Moore) - 9:57  Bonus track on CD reissue  
 "What Other One" - 4:58  Bonus track on CD reissue  
 "Gravity Point" (Moore) - 5:08  Bonus track on CD reissue   
Recorded at United Sound System, Detroit, Michigan on December 9, 1968 (tracks 1-6) and G.M. Recording Studios, Detroit, Michigan on November 26, 1969 (tracks 7-12).

Personnel
Kenny Cox - piano
Charles Moore - trumpet
Leon Henderson - tenor saxophone 
Ron Brooks  - bass
Danny Spencer - drums

References

Blue Note Records albums
Kenny Cox albums
1968 debut albums
Albums produced by Michael Cuscuna